The Jim Piggott Memorial Trophy is presented annually to the Western Hockey League player selected as the most proficient in his first year of competition. The award is named after Jim Piggott who was the founder of the Saskatoon Blades, as well as one of the founding fathers on what is today the Western Hockey League.

The trophy was previously named the Stewart "Butch" Paul Memorial Trophy. Butch Paul was a player for the Edmonton Oil Kings in the 1960s, leading the team to three straight Western Canada Championships, and a Memorial Cup in 1963. He later played for the Detroit Red Wings of the National Hockey League (NHL) and during his second year in the organization he died in a car accident on March 25, 1966.

Winners

Blue background denotes also named CHL Rookie of the Year
1The WHL handed out separate awards for the East and West divisions.

See also
CHL Rookie of the Year
Emms Family Award – Ontario Hockey League Rookie of the Year
RDS Cup – Quebec Major Junior Hockey League Rookie of the Year

References

Western Hockey League trophies and awards
Rookie player awards
Awards established in 1966